A list of French-produced or co-produced films released in France in 2010. 263 French films were released in 2010.

Notes

External links
 2010 in France
 2010 in French television
 French films of 2010 at the Internet Movie Database
French films of 2010 at Cinema-francais.fr

2010
Films
French